Trichothyrium is a genus of fungi in the Trichothyriaceae family.

Species
As accepted by Species Fungorum;

 Trichothyrium alpestre 
 Trichothyrium asterolibertiae 
 Trichothyrium asterophorum  
 Trichothyrium atroviolaceum 
 Trichothyrium austriacum 
 Trichothyrium caruaruense 
 Trichothyrium collapsum 
 Trichothyrium consors 
 Trichothyrium densa 
 Trichothyrium dubiosum 
 Trichothyrium iquitosense 
 Trichothyrium jungermannioides 
 Trichothyrium lomatophorum 
 Trichothyrium mirabilis 
 Trichothyrium modestum 
 Trichothyrium oleaceae 
 Trichothyrium orbiculare 
 Trichothyrium peristomale 
 Trichothyrium reptans 
 Trichothyrium robustum 
 Trichothyrium sarciniferum 
 Trichothyrium serratum 
 Trichothyrium sexsporum 
 Trichothyrium spinulosum 
 Trichothyrium ulei 

Former species;
 T. alpestre f. pini-pumilionis  = Trichothyrium alpestre, Trichothyriaceae
 T. asterophorum var. singulatum  = Trichothyrium asterophorum, Trichothyriaceae
 T. chilense  = Trichopeltina chilensis, Trichopeltinaceae
 T. densum  = Trichothyrium densa, Trichothyriaceae
 T. dryadis  = Stomiopeltis dryadis, Micropeltidaceae
 T. elegans  = Trichothyrina elegans, Microthyriaceae
 T. epimyces  = Microthyrium epimyces, Microthyriaceae
 T. hansfordii  = Hansfordiella meliolae, Microthyriaceae
 T. notatum  = Trichothyriomyces notatus, Microthyriaceae
 T. pinophyllum  = Microthyrium pinophyllum, Microthyriaceae
 T. ugandense  = Trichothyrina ugandensis, Microthyriaceae

References

External links
Index Fungorum

Microthyriales